Gorka is a rural locality (a village) in Lipetskoye Rural Settlement, Verkhovazhsky District, Vologda Oblast, Russia. The population was 18 as of 2002.

Geography 
The distance to Verkhovazhye is 69.7 km, to Leushinskaya is 2 km. Leushinskaya, Ivonino, Svetilnovo, Sloboda are the nearest rural localities.

References 

Rural localities in Verkhovazhsky District